Felinology is the study of cats. The term is of Latin-Greek origin and comes from the Latin word  (of cats, feline) and the Greek  (science). Felinology is concerned with studying the anatomy, genetics, physiology, and breeding of domestic and wild cats.

References

External links
"The wonders of felinology" (Haaretz)
Feline Research Center
 National Federation of Felinology 

 
Mammalogy